Enumerator may refer to:
Iterator (computer science)
An enumerator in the context of iteratees
in computer programming, a value of an enumerated type
Enumerator (computer science), a Turing machine that lists elements of some set S.
a census taker, a person performing door-to-door around census, to count the people and gather demographic data.
a person employed in the counting of votes in an election.
Enumerator polynomial